Sheikha Maha Mansour Salman Jasim Al Thani is a Qatari judge.

Her appointment in March 2010 made her Qatar's first female judge. In 2013 she was listed sixth on CEO Middle East’s list of 100 most powerful Arab women.

References

Year of birth missing (living people)
Living people
Qatari civil servants
21st-century judges
Qatari lawyers
21st-century women judges